Triplicane is the legislative assembly, that includes the city, Triplicane. Triplicane assembly constituency was part of Chennai South (Lok Sabha constituency). Post constituency delimitation of 2008, this constituency is merged into the newly formed Chepauk-Thiruvallikeni constituency.

Madras State

Tamil Nadu

Election results

2006

2001

1996

1991

1989

1984

1980

1977

1971

1967

1962

1957

1952

References

External links
 

Former assembly constituencies of Tamil Nadu
Constituencies established in 1952
1952 establishments in Madras State
Constituencies disestablished in 1967
1967 disestablishments in India
Constituencies established in 1971
1971 establishments in Tamil Nadu
Constituencies disestablished in 2011
2011 disestablishments in India